Anthela callispila is a species of moth of the Anthelidae family. It is found in South Australia, New South Wales and Queensland.

References

Moths described in 1905
Anthelidae